Mary Willard may refer to:
 Mary Louisa Willard, forensic scientist
 Mary Bannister Willard, American editor, temperance worker, and educator
 Mary Thompson Hill Willard, American teacher and social reformer
 Patsy Willard (Mary Patricia Willard), American diver